Ugly Man Records is a British independent record label based in Rhos on Sea, Wales, originally in Manchester. It released debut singles for many Manchester bands, including Elbow, the Man From Delmonte and I Am Kloot. It was set up in Bootle, Merseyside in 1986 with the release of "Wonderful Life" by the Liverpool-based band Black, which reached number 72 in the UK Singles Chart.

Previously on Ugly Man Records
Artists who have worked with Ugly Man Records

 balaji  b214
 Black
 Bone-Box
 Mustafa Kamal Qureshi
 The Spitting Pips
 Grown Up Strange
 The Danny Boys
 Man From Delmonte
 Gayna Rose Madder
 The Desert Wolves
 Dub Sex
 The County Fathers
 Ambitious Beggars
 Too Much Texas
 Fallover 24
 Jylt
 Arthur Magee
 I Am Kloot
 Elbow
 Sleepwalker
 Loafer
 LazyEye
 The Jade Assembly
 Bryan Glancy
 Indigo Jones
 Silverman
 The Milk & Honey Band
 Josephine Oniyama
 Vinny Peculiar
 Tompaulin
 Monomania
 Sandbox
 Sandy Kilpatrick
 Shakedown Stockholm
 Jimmy & the Revolvers
 Echolines

See also
 List of record labels
 List of independent UK record labels

References

External links
 The chronicle of an Ugly Man - a memoir of a label
 The Mighty Discogs - Ugly Man Discography

British independent record labels
Record labels established in 1986
Indie rock record labels
1986 establishments in the United Kingdom